Fernando Simón Soria  (born 29 July 1963) is a Spanish epidemiologist serving as Director of the Coordination Centre for Health Alerts and Emergencies of the Ministry of Health. He came to public prominence as spokesman for the special committee on Ebola virus disease in Spain in 2014, and a similar role during the COVID-19 pandemic. Simón tested positive for coronavirus on 30 March 2020.

Early life and education

Born in Zaragoza, he graduated in Medicine at the University of Zaragoza, and specialized in Public Health and Epidemiology at the London School of Hygiene & Tropical Medicine. Simón trained in the European Training Program in Intervention Epidemiology at the European Centre for Disease Prevention and Control.

Career

Simón was director of the Center for Research in Tropical Diseases in Manhiça District, in Mozambique, and of the Ntita Hospital in Burundi.

He was also a director of programs in the National Center of Epidemiology (CNE), and a coordinator of the Health Alert and Response Unit in the CNE from 2003 to 2011. He is currently a professor at the National School of Public Health, and a member of the advisory committee of the European Centre for Disease Prevention and Control (ECDC).

In June 2020 he received the Emilio Castelar 2020 award.

References 

1963 births
Living people
Spanish scientists
People from Zaragoza
University of Zaragoza alumni
Spanish epidemiologists
Alumni of the London School of Hygiene & Tropical Medicine
Spanish civil servants